The Shepperton Stakes is a Thoroughbred horse race run annually in early August at Woodbine Racetrack in Toronto, Ontario, Canada. An Ontario Sire Stakes, it is a restricted race for horses age three and older. Raced on  all-weather synthetic dirt over a distance of six and one-half furlongs, the Shepperton Stakes currently carries a purse of $100,000.

The race is named in honor of Canadian Horse Racing Hall of Fame inductee, Shepperton. Inaugurated in 1976 as a 7 furlong race at Greenwood Raceway, the following year it was modified to its present 6.5 furlongs and shifted to the Fort Erie Racetrack where it remained until 1981 when it was moved to Woodbine Racetrack.

In 2005, Sophia's Prince's winning time broke a forty-four-year-old track record.

Records
Speed  record: 
 1:14.56 - Sophia's Prince (2005)

Most wins:
 3 - Paso Dobles (2011, 2013, 2014)
 3 - Pink Lloyd (2017, 2019, 2020)

Most wins by an owner:
 3 - Centennial Farms (2011, 2013, 2014)
 3 - Entourage Stable (2017, 2019, 2020)
 2 - Kinghaven Farms (1984, 1997)
 2 - Frank Stronach (1994, 1995)
 2 - Bruno Schickedanz & John Hillier (1999, 2000)

Most wins by a jockey:
 7 - David Clark (1978, 1980, 1983, 1986, 1888, 1996, 2006)

Most wins by a trainer:
 6 - Robert P. Tiller (2003, 2006, 2008, 2017, 2019, 2020)
 4 - Mark Casse (2010, 2011, 2013, 2014)

Winners of the Shepperton Stakes

References

 The Shepperton Stakes at Pedigree Query
 Shepperton Stakes at Woodbine Racetrack official website

Ontario Sire Stakes
Ungraded stakes races in Canada
Open sprint category horse races
Recurring sporting events established in 1976
Woodbine Racetrack
1976 establishments in Ontario